= Carangas, Oruro =

Coordinates: 18.94°S 68.6247°W

Carangas (Oruro)
- Village
- Interactive map of Carangas (Oruro)
- Country: Bolivia
- Time zone: UTC-4 (BOT)

Carangas (Oruro) is a small village in Bolivia. In 2010 it had an estimated population of 47.

== Climate ==
Climate data for Todo Santos (Note: Todo Santos is located approximately 13 kilometres (8.1 mi) south-west of Carangas.), elevation 3,920 m (12,860 ft), (1977–2013)
Month	Jan	Feb	Mar	Apr	May	Jun	Jul	Aug	Sep	Oct	Nov	Dec	Year
Record high °C (°F)	24.5 (76.1)	26.0 (78.8)	24.5 (76.1)	23.0 (73.4)	21.0 (69.8)	19.0 (66.2)	21.0 (69.8)	21.0 (69.8)	24.5 (76.1)	25.0 (77.0)	26.0 (78.8)	27.5 (81.5)	27.5 (81.5)
Mean daily maximum °C (°F)	17.9 (64.2)	17.3 (63.1)	17.9 (64.2)	17.5 (63.5)	15.5 (59.9)	14.6 (58.3)	14.5 (58.1)	15.5 (59.9)	16.3 (61.3)	18.1 (64.6)	19.4 (66.9)	19.5 (67.1)	17.0 (62.6)
Daily mean °C (°F)	10.2 (50.4)	9.9 (49.8)	9.7 (49.5)	8.7 (47.7)	6.1 (43.0)	4.1 (39.4)	3.9 (39.0)	5.8 (42.4)	7.5 (45.5)	8.2 (46.8)	9.6 (49.3)	11.0 (51.8)	7.9 (46.2)
Mean daily minimum °C (°F)	2.8 (37.0)	2.8 (37.0)	1.3 (34.3)	−0.1 (31.8)	−3.0 (26.6)	−5.7 (21.7)	−6.0 (21.2)	−3.8 (25.2)	−1.0 (30.2)	−1.1 (30.0)	0.3 (32.5)	2.5 (36.5)	−0.9 (30.3)
Record low °C (°F)	−7.0 (19.4)	−6.0 (21.2)	−10.0 (14.0)	−8.0 (17.6)	−14.0 (6.8)	−16.5 (2.3)	−17.0 (1.4)	−14.5 (5.9)	−10.0 (14.0)	−11.0 (12.2)	−15.0 (5.0)	−11.0 (12.2)	−17.0 (1.4)
Average precipitation mm (inches)	90.3 (3.56)	79.6 (3.13)	33.6 (1.32)	3.3 (0.13)	0.5 (0.02)	0.7 (0.03)	3.3 (0.13)	0.3 (0.01)	1.2 (0.05)	4.1 (0.16)	7.2 (0.28)	29.9 (1.18)	254 (10)
Average precipitation days	10.6	9.0	5.7	0.8	0.1	0.1	0.3	0.1	0.3	1.0	1.2	4.0	33.2
Average relative humidity (%)	74.2	76.7	76.5	77.4	75.8	74.9	76.1	76.8	73.1	72.7	73.6	74.7	75.2
Source: Servicio Nacional de Meteorología e Hidrología de Bolivia
